Lars Fredrik Bergström (born 19 March 1975) is a male badminton player from Sweden.

Bergstrom competed in badminton at the 2004 Summer Olympics in mixed doubles with partner Johanna Persson.  They defeated Mike Beres and Jody Patrick of Canada in the first round and Sudket Prapakamol and Saralee Thungthongkam of Thailand in the second.  In the quarterfinals, Bergström and Persson lost to Zhang Jun and Gao Ling of China 15–3, 15–1.

References

External links
 
 
 
 

Swedish male badminton players
Olympic badminton players of Sweden
Badminton players at the 2004 Summer Olympics
1975 births
Living people
Badminton players at the 2000 Summer Olympics
21st-century Swedish people